This is a list of colleges and universities identified as having smoke-free campus policies. They are those institutions of higher learning that have entirely prohibited smoking on campus. Campuses that allow smoking only in very remote outdoor areas are marked with an asterisk. The list does not include those schools with designated smoking areas near buildings or walkways. The list also includes those institutions that have enacted such policies and whose date of implementation is pending.

Institutions choose to ban smoking for various reasons, many related to college health goals.

Asia

China
Peking University*
Tsinghua University*
China University of Political Science and Law*
University of Science & Technology Beijing*
Liaoning Finance and Trade College*

Hong Kong
Note: In accordance to the Hong Kong Law, all schools, universities, post secondary colleges, technical colleges or technical institutes, industrial training centres or skill centres, colleges for higher educations are classified as non-smoking areas, which are strictly prohibited by law, enforcements and penalties. The no smoking area in the above school areas include all outdoor and indoor perimeters, which are included but not limited to the following institutions,

The Hong Kong Polytechnic University
The University of Hong Kong
The Hong Kong University of Science and Technology
The Hong Kong Academy for Performing Arts
Chu Hai College of Higher Education
City University of Hong Kong
Hong Kong Baptist University
The Hong Kong Institute of Education
Hong Kong Shue Yan University
Lingnan University
The Open University of Hong Kong
The Chinese University of Hong Kong

Indonesia
Faculty of Public Health Diponegoro University

Macau
University of Macau*

The Philippines
University of Santo Tomas 
De La Salle University – Dasmariñas

United Arab Emirates
HCT Dubai Men's College

Yemen
 Lebanese International University

Africa

Durban University of Technology known as  dut with so many campaigns.

Oceania

Australia
Australian Catholic University
Australian National University
Charles Sturt University
Curtin University
Deakin University 
Edith Cowan University 
Federation University Australia 
Griffith University
La Trobe University 
Macquarie University 
Monash University
Murdoch University
University of Notre Dame Australia
Queensland University of Technology 
RMIT University 
Swinburne University of Technology 
University of Adelaide
University of Canberra
University of Melbourne 
University of New South Wales 
University of South Australia
University of Southern Queensland 
University of Technology Sydney
University of Sydney 
University of Western Australia
University of Wollongong
Victoria University, Australia
Western Sydney University

New Zealand
University of Auckland
University of Waikato
Massey University
Victoria University of Wellington
University of Otago
University of Canterbury
Unitec

Europe

Finland
University of Helsinki*
University of Eastern Finland
University of Turku

The Netherlands
Tilburg University

Ireland
National University of Ireland
University College Dublin (Progressively introducing to be tobacco free by 2019)
University of Limerick
Athlone Institute of Technology

Italy

 University of Milano-Bicocca

Holy See
 Pontifical Lateran University

United Kingdom

Imperial College London
King's College London
Northumbria University*
University of Bradford*
University of Leeds
University of the West of England – Frenchay Campus
University of Warwick
Teesside University – Darlington Campus
Teesside University – Middlesbrough Campus

Note: The aforementioned institutions are implementing on the policy in fact. Other than that there have been a number of universities carrying out non-smoking policy but without actual enforcement.

Turkey
 Bilkent University

Americas

Canada

Alberta
 Ambrose University
 Bow Valley College
 Burman University
 Concordia University of Edmonton
 Grande Prairie Regional College
 NorQuest College
 Northern Alberta Institute of Technology
Southern Alberta Institute of Technology
 The King's University

British Columbia
 Douglas College
 Kwantlen Polytechnic University
 Langara College
 Trinity Western University
 University of the Fraser Valley

Manitoba
 Canadian Mennonite University
 Manitoba Institute of Trades and Technology
 Providence University College
 Red River College
 University of Manitoba, Bannatyne
 University of Winnipeg

New Brunswick
 Collège communautaire du Nouveau-Brunswick, Edmundston
 Crandall University 
 Kingswood University

Newfoundland and Labrador
 College of the North Atlantic
 Marine Institute
 Memorial University of Newfoundland

Nova Scotia
 Acadia University
 Dalhousie University
 NSCAD University 
 Saint Mary's University
 University of King's College

Ontario
 Algonquin College
 Centennial College
 Fanshawe College
 George Brown College
 Humber College
 Lambton College
 Loyalist College
 McMaster University
 Mohawk College 
 Redeemer University
 St. Lawrence College
 Saint Paul University 
 Sheridan College 
 University of Guelph
 University of Ontario Institute of Technology 
 University of Toronto (3 campuses)
 University of Western Ontario
 Wilfrid Laurier University

Prince Edward Island
 Holland College
 Maritime Christian College
 University of Prince Edward Island

Quebec
 Ahuntsic College
 Bart College
 Cégep André-Laurendeau
 Cégep Beauce-Appalaches
 Cégep de Drummondville
 Cégep de l'Abitibi-Témiscamingue
 Cégep de Matane
 Cégep de la Gaspésie et des Îles
 Cégep de l'Outaouais
 Cégep de Rimouski
 Cégep de Rivière‐du‐Loup
 Cégep de Sainte-Foy
 Cégep de Saint-Jérôme
 Cégep de Sherbrooke
 Cégep de Sorel-Tracy
 Cégep de Trois-Rivières
 Cégep de Victoriaville
 Cégep du Vieux Montréal 
 Cégep Édouard-Montpetit 
 Cégep Garneau
 Cégep Limoilou
 Cégep régional de Lanaudière
 Cégep Saint-Laurent
 Champlain Regional College, Saint-Lambert, Quebec
 College Jean-de-Brébeuf
 College of Maisonneuve
 College of Rosemont
 Collégial International Sainte-Anne 
 Dawson College 
 John Abbott College
 Vanier College

Saskatchewan
 Carlton Trail Regional College
 Millar College
 University of Regina

Yukon
 Yukon College

United States

Alabama
Auburn University
Auburn University at Montgomery
Calhoun Community College
Central Alabama Community College (3 campuses)
Coastal Alabama Community College (11 campuses)
Concordia College Alabama
Faulkner University
Heritage Christian University
Huntingdon College
J.F. Drake State Comm & Tech College (2 campuses)
Judson College (Alabama)
Miles College (restricted tobacco use on campus)
Northwest-Shoals Community College (2 campuses)
Oakwood University
Snead State Community College (2 campuses)
Southern Union State Community College (3 campuses)
Stillman College
Talladega College
Troy University – Alabama Campuses (4 campuses)
Tuskegee University
University of Alabama
University of South Alabama
Wallace Community College

Alaska
Wayland Baptist University (Anchorage, Alaska) (2 campuses)
University of Alaska Anchorage
University of Alaska Fairbanks
University of Alaska Southeast
Alaska Bible College
Alaska Bible Institute
Alaska Christian College
Alaska Pacific University

Arizona
A.T. Still University – Mesa
University of Arizona
 Arizona State University
Benedictine University – Mesa
Embry–Riddle Aeronautical University, Prescott effective August 1, 2013
Maricopa Community Colleges
Chandler-Gilbert Community College (3 campuses)
Estrella Mountain Community College (3 campuses)
GateWay Community College (3 campuses)
Glendale Community College (2 campuses)
Mesa Community College (3 campuses)
Paradise Valley Community College (2 campuses)
Phoenix College (4 campuses)
Rio Salado College (8 campuses)
Scottsdale Community College
South Mountain Community College
Northern Arizona University
Arizona Western College (10 campuses)

Arkansas
All public institutions are smoke-free as a result of the Arkansas Clean Air on Campus Act of 2009.
Arkansas Northeastern College
Arkansas State University Mid-South
Arkansas State University – Beebe (2-Year College System) (3 campuses)
Arkansas State University-Main Campus (2 campuses)
Arkansas State University-Mountain Home (2-year campus)
Arkansas State University-Newport (3 campuses)
Arkansas Tech University
Black River Technical College
College of the Ouachitas
Cossatot Community College of the Univ. of Arkansas
East Arkansas Community College
Henderson State University
National Park College
North Arkansas College (4 campuses)
Northwest Arkansas Community College (6 campuses)
Ouachita Baptist University
Ozarka College (4 campuses)
Phillips Community College (3 campuses)
Pulaski Technical College (6 campuses)
Rich Mountain Community College
Shorter College
South Arkansas Community College
Southeast Arkansas College
Southern Arkansas University
 Southern Arkansas University Tech
 University of Arkansas – Fayetteville
 University of Arkansas – Fort Smith
 University of Arkansas at Little Rock
 University of Arkansas at Monticello
 University of Arkansas at Pine Bluff
 University of Arkansas – Batesville
 University of Arkansas – Hope (2 campuses)
 University of Arkansas – Morrilton
University of Arkansas Criminal Justice Institute
University of Central Arkansas
University of the Ozarks

California
American River College (Los Rios) to take effect on all campuses by 2016
Bakersfield College (3 campuses)
Berkeley City College
Cabrillo College*
California State University, Dominguez Hills
California State University, Fullerton
California State University, Long Beach
California State University, Los Angeles
California State University, Northridge
California State University San Marcos
Cañada College*
Cedars-Sinai Medical Center
Cerritos College
Chabot College*
Chapman University
College of San Mateo*
College of the Redwoods (6 campuses)
Contra Costa College*
Cosumnes River College (2 campuses)
Cuyamaca Community College
Cypress College
De Anza College*
Diablo Valley College (2 campuses)
East Los Angeles College (designated smoking areas)
El Camino College
Folsom Lake College (3 campuses)
Foothill College*
Fresno Pacific University
Fullerton College
Glendale Community College (California)
Golden West College*
Grossmont Community College
Imperial Valley College
Keck Hospital of USC
Laney College
Las Positas College*
Loma Linda University
Long Beach City College (designated smoking areas)
Los Angeles City College
LAC+USC Medical Center
Los Angeles Harbor College
Los Angeles Trade Technical College (designated smoking areas)
Los Medanos College*
Merritt College
Mesa College
MiraCosta College
Mission College*
Monterey Peninsula College*
Moorpark College*
Moreno Valley College
Northeastern University – Silicon Valley Campus
Northwest University – Sacramento Campus
Ohlone College* (2 campuses)
Oxnard College*
Palomar College (6 campus)
Pasadena City College* (4 campuses)
Pierce College*
Point Loma Nazarene University
Reedley College
Riverside City College (3 campuses)
Riverside Community College*
Sacramento City College
Saint Mary's College of California
San Diego City College
San Diego Mesa College
San Diego Miramar College*
San Francisco State University*
San Joaquin Delta College*
San Jose City College*
San Jose State University
Santa Ana College*
Santa Barbara City College (3 campuses)
Santa Clara University (2 campuses)
Santa Monica College*
Santa Rosa Junior College
Santiago Canyon College*
Sierra College (4 campuses) 
Simpson University
Skyline College*
Solano Community College
Sonoma State University 
Southwestern College*
Springfield College (California)
Stanford University Medical School
Unitek College (Fremont, Sacramento, Concord, San Jose)
University of California to take effect on all campuses by 2014
University of California, Berkeley
University of California, Los Angeles
University of California, Davis
University of California, Irvine
University of California, Merced
University of California, Riverside
University of California, San Diego
University of California, San Francisco
University of California, Santa Barbara
University of California, Santa Cruz
 University of California Medical Center campuses
University of San Francisco*
University of Southern California
West Los Angeles College (designated smoking areas)
West Valley-Mission Community College*
Woodland Community College
Yuba College

Colorado
Colorado Christian University
Colorado Mountain College
Colorado State University
Columbia College (Colorado)
Denver School of Nursing
Naropa University*
Northeastern Junior College
University of Colorado Anschutz Medical Campus
University of Colorado Boulder
University of Denver*

Connecticut
Southern Connecticut State University*
Gateway Community College
Hartford Community College
Quinebaug Valley Community College
Quinnipiac University – North Haven Campus
Norwalk Community College*
Rensselaer Polytechnic Institute, Hartford
University of New Haven
Yale University
University of Connecticut Health Center
Central Connecticut State University*

Delaware
Delaware State University (3 campuses)
Delaware Technical Community College
Springfield College (Delaware extension campus)
Widener University Delaware School of Law

District of Columbia
American University effective August 1, 2013
George Washington University* effective September 2013
Georgetown University (designated smoking areas)
Georgetown University Medical Center. The Medstar part (but, not the GU part) is posted as smoke free both indoors and outdoors.

Florida
Adventist University of Health Sciences
Barry University
Bethune–Cookman University
Broward College (12 campuses)
Charlotte Technical College
Columbia College – Jacksonville & Orlando Campuses
Daytona State College (7 campuses)
Edward Waters University
Embry-Riddle Aeronautical University, Daytona Beach
Flagler College
Florida Atlantic University 
Florida Gulf Coast University
Florida International University
Florida SouthWestern State College
Florida State College at Jacksonville
Florida State University 
Gulf Coast State College
Hillsborough Community College
Hodges University
Johnson & Wales University – North Miami Campus 
Lynn University
Miami Dade College (8 campuses)
Nova Southeastern University
Pensacola Christian College
Santa Fe College (5 campuses)
South Florida State College (4 campuses)
Springfield College (Florida extension campus) 
State College of Florida, Manatee–Sarasota
Stetson University
St. Petersburg College (11 campuses) 
Troy University – Florida Sites (5 campuses)
University of Central Florida
University of Florida
University of Florida Academic Health Center/Shands
University of Miami Medical Campus
University of South Florida
Sarasota-Manatee
St. Petersburg 
University of South Florida Health
University of Tampa
Valencia College
Warner University

Georgia
Abraham Baldwin Agricultural College
Albany State University
Albany Technical College
Armstrong State University
Athens Technical College
Augusta Technical College
Augusta University
Berry College
Coastal Pines Technical College
College of Coastal Georgia
Columbus Technical College
Dalton State College*
Darton State College
East Georgia College*
Emory University
Gainesville College
Georgia Highlands College
Georgia Northwestern Technical College
Georgia Piedmont Technical College
Georgia Southern University
Georgia State University
Gordon State College
Gwinnett Technical College
Lanier Technical College
Kennesaw State University
Medical College of Georgia
Mercer University
Morehouse School of Medicine
North Georgia College & State University*
North Georgia Technical College
Oconee Fall Line Technical College
Ogeechee Technical College
Oglethorpe University
Philadelphia College of Osteopathic Medicine, GA Campus
Piedmont University
Savannah State University
Shorter University
Southeastern Technical College
Southern Regional Technical College
Spelman College
Troy University – Georgia Sites
University of Georgia
University of North Georgia
University of West Georgia
University System of Georgia
Valdosta State University

Guam
Guam Community College
University of Guam

Hawaii
Brigham Young University-Hawaii
Kapiolani Community College

Idaho
Boise State University
Brigham Young University–Idaho
Carrington College, Boise
College of Southern Idaho
College of Western Idaho (4 campuses)
Idaho State University (4 campuses)
Northwest Nazarene University
University of Idaho

Illinois
All state-supported institutions in Illinois must be smoke-free, in compliance with the Illinois Smoke Free Campus Act, effective July 1, 2015.
Aurora University
Benedictine University (2 campuses)
Blessing-Rieman College of Nursing
Carl Sandburg College
Chicago State University
City Colleges of Chicago
College of DuPage
College of Lake County
Columbia College – Crystal Lake Campus
Danville Area Community College
Dominican University (Illinois)
East St. Louis Community College Center 
Eastern Illinois University (4 campuses)
Elgin Community College
Governors State University
Greenville University
Hannibal-LaGrange University
Heartland Community College
Illinois Central College
Illinois Eastern Community Colleges (4 campuses)
Illinois State University
Illinois Valley Community College
Indiana Institute of Technology – Illinois Campuses (2 campuses) 
John A. Logan College
John Wood Community College
Joliet Junior College (6 campuses)
Judson University
Kankakee Community College
Kaskaskia College
Kishwaukee College
Lake Land College
Lewis and Clark Community College
Lincoln Land Community College
McHenry County College
Moody Bible Institute
Moraine Valley Community College
Morton College
North Central College
Northeastern Illinois University (5 campuses)
Oakton Community College
Olivet Nazarene University
Parkland College
Prairie State College
Rend Lake College
Richland Community College
Rock Valley College
Rush University
Saint Xavier University
Sauk Valley Community College
Shawnee Community College
South Suburban College (2 campuses) 
Southeastern Illinois College
Southern Illinois University Carbondale
Southern Illinois University Edwardsville
Southwestern Illinois College
Spoon River College
Triton College
University of Illinois at Chicago
University of Illinois at Urbana–Champaign
Waubonsee Community College
Western Illinois University (2 campuses) 
Wheaton College
William Rainey Harper College (3 campuses)

Indiana
Ancilla College*
Anderson University
Associated Mennonite Biblical Seminary
Ball State University
Bethel College
Crossroads Bible College
Earlham College*
Franklin College
Goshen College
Grace College
Holy Cross College
Huntington University
Indiana University*
Indiana University Bloomington*
Indiana University East
Indiana University Kokomo
Indiana University Northwest
Indiana University South Bend
Indiana University Southeast
Indiana University – Purdue University Columbus*
Indiana University – Purdue University Fort Wayne*
Indiana University – Purdue University Indianapolis
Indiana Tech
Indiana Wesleyan University
ITT Technical Institute
Ivy Tech Community College of Indiana
Manchester University (2 campuses)
Marian University (Indiana)
Martin University
Purdue University*
Purdue University Calumet
Purdue University North Central
Saint Mary-of-the-Woods College
Taylor University
Trine University*
University of Evansville
University of Indianapolis
University of Notre Dame*
University of Saint Francis
Valparaiso University
Vincennes University*

Iowa
All public and private institutions are smoke-free by law.
Allen College
Briar Cliff University
Buena Vista University
Central College (Iowa)
Clarke University
Coe College
Cornell College
Des Moines Area Community College (12 campuses)
Des Moines University
Divine Word College
Dordt University
Drake University
Eastern Iowa Community College District (4 campuses)
Ellsworth Community College (2 campuses) 
Emmaus Bible College (Iowa)
Faith Baptist Bible College & Theological Seminary
Graceland University (3 campuses) 
Grand View University
Grinnell College
Hamilton Technical College
Hawkeye Community College (10 campuses)
Indian Hills Community College (3 campuses)
Iowa Central Community College
Iowa Lakes Community College (5 campuses) 
Iowa State University
Iowa Valley Grinnell
Iowa Wesleyan University
Iowa Western Community College
Kirkwood Community College
Loras College
Luther College (Iowa)
Maharishi University of Management
Marshalltown Community College
Mercy College of Health Sciences
Morningside University
Mount Mercy University
North Iowa Area Community College 
Northeast Iowa Community College (2 campuses)
Northwest Iowa Community College
Northwestern College
Palmer College of Chiropractic
Simpson College
Southeastern Community College (4 campuses) 
Southwestern Community College (3 campuses) 
St. Ambrose University 
St. Luke's College
University of Dubuque
University of Iowa (2 campuses)
University of Phoenix – Des Moines Campus
Upper Iowa University
Vatterott College
Waldorf College
Wartburg College
Wartburg Theological Seminary
Western Iowa Tech Community College (6 campuses)
William Penn University

Kansas
Barclay College
Butler Community College (6 campuses)
Central Christian College of Kansas
Emporia State University
Flint Hills Technical College
Fort Hays State University
Friends University (3 campuses)
Highland Community College (6 campuses)
Kansas Christian College
Kansas City Kansas Community College (3 campuses)
Kansas State University (3 campuses)
Kansas Wesleyan University
Labette Community College
Manhattan Christian College
MidAmerica Nazarene University
Pittsburg State University
Pratt Community College
Salina Area Technical College
University of Kansas (all campuses)
University of Kansas Medical Center campuses

Kentucky
Ashland Community and Technical College
Bellarmine University
Big Sandy Community & Tech College (4 campuses) 
Bluegrass Community and Technical College
Campbellsville University (6 campuses)
Elizabethtown Community and Technical College (11 campuses)
Gateway Community and Technical College (4 campuses)
Hazard Community and Technical College (5 campuses)
Henderson Community College (3 campuses)
Hopkinsville Community College
Indiana Institute of Technology – KY Campuses (2 campuses) 
Indiana Wesleyan University – Kentucky Sites (3 campuses)
Jefferson Community and Technical College (6 campuses)
Kentucky State University 
Kentucky Wesleyan College
Madisonville Community College Health Sciences Campus 
Maysville Community and Technical College
Morehead State University
Northern Kentucky University
Owensboro Community and Technical College
Southcentral Kentucky Community and Technical College (6 campuses)
Southeast Kentucky Community and Technical College (5 campuses) 
Spalding University
St. Catharine College*
Thomas More College (Kentucky)
Transylvania University
Union College
University of Kentucky, Lexington Campus
University of Louisville
University of Pikeville
West Kentucky Community and Technical College (7 campuses)

Louisiana
All public institutions effective August 1, 2014
Baton Rouge Community College (8 campuses)
Bossier Parish Community College
Central Louisiana Technical Community College (7 campuses) 
Delgado Community College (7 campuses) 
Dillard University
Fletcher Technical Community College (5 campuses) 
Franciscan Missionaries of Our Lady University
Grambling State University 
Louisiana Delta Community College
Louisiana State University of Alexandria
Louisiana State University Eunice
Louisiana State University Shreveport
Louisiana Tech University 
Loyola University New Orleans (2 campuses) 
LSUHSC New Orleans 
LSUHSC Shreveport
Nicholls State University
Northshore Technical Community College (3 campuses)
Northwest Louisiana Technical College (5 campuses)
Northwestern State University (4 campuses)
Nunez Community College 
River Parishes Community College (2 campuses) 
South Central Louisiana Technical College
Southeastern Louisiana University
Southern University
South Louisiana Community College
SOWELA Technical Community College, Lake Charles (2 campuses) 
Tulane University (6 campuses) 
University of Louisiana at Monroe 
University of New Orleans, effective August 1, 2014
Xavier University of Louisiana

Maine
Colby College*
Husson University (3 campuses)
Kennebec Valley Community College
Maine Maritime Academy
Saint Joseph's College of Maine
University of Maine, Orono
University of Maine at Augusta
University of Maine at Farmington
University of New England (2 campuses)
University of Southern Maine
University of Maine at Presque Isle
York County Community College

Maryland
Anne Arundel Community College (7 campuses)
Carroll Community College
Cecil College (2 campuses)
Chesapeake College
Frederick Community College*
Frostburg State University
Garrett College
Goucher College
Hagerstown Community College
Harford Community College
Howard Community College
Maryland Bible College and Seminary
Montgomery College
Morgan State University
Prince George's Community College (4 campuses)
Salisbury University
Towson University
Washington Adventist University
University of Maryland*

Massachusetts
Bentley University
Berkshire Community College (2 campuses)
Boston University Medical Campus
Bridgewater State University
Bristol Community College
Cape Cod Community College
Emmanuel College
Harvard Medical School
Harvard School of Dental Medicine
Harvard School of Public Health
John F. Kennedy School of Government (Harvard University)
Holyoke Community College
Massachusetts College of Liberal Arts
Massachusetts Maritime Academy
Middlesex Community College (2 campuses)
North Shore Community College
Northeastern University
Northern Essex Community College (7 campuses)
Quinsigamond Community College (3 campuses)
Salem State University
Simmons College
Springfield College
Tufts University (Boston campus)
University of Massachusetts Amherst
University of Massachusetts Boston
University of Massachusetts Medical School
University of Massachusetts Lowell
Westfield State University*
Worcester Polytechnic Institute*
Worcester State University*

Michigan
Alpena Community College
Andrews University
Baker College
Bay College
Calvin University*
Central Michigan University
Davenport University
Delta College
Eastern Michigan University
Finlandia University
Glen Oaks Community College
Grand Rapids Community College
Great Lakes Christian College
Henry Ford Community College
Hope College
Indiana Institute of Technology – Michigan Campus 
Jackson College
Kalamazoo Valley Community College
Kirtland Community College
Lansing Community College
Michigan State University (tobacco-free campus policy took effect in August 2016)
Michigan Technological University
Mid-Michigan Community College (2 campuses) 
Monroe County Community College
Montcalm Community College
Moody Theological Seminary 
Mott Community College
Muskegon Community College
North Central Michigan College
Northern Michigan University
Northwestern Michigan College
Northern Michigan University
Oakland Community College
Oakland University
Saginaw Valley State University*
Schoolcraft College
Spring Arbor University
St. Clair County Community College (6 campuses) 
University of Michigan
Wayne State University
Washtenaw Community College
Western Michigan University

Minnesota
Argosy University (Twin Cities campus)
Bemidji State University
Bethel University
Century College
College of St. Scholastica
Cook County Higher Education at The North Shore Campus
Dakota County Technical College
Itasca Community College
Lake Superior College
Leech Lake Tribal College
Mesabi Range Community and Technical College
Minnesota State University, Mankato
Minnesota State University Moorhead
Minnesota West Community and Technical College
North Central University
Northwest Technical College
Northwestern College
Northwestern Health Sciences University
Rainy River Community College
Rasmussen College (Moorhead and St. Cloud campuses)
 Rasmussen College (Waite Park campus)*
Ridgewater College
Riverland Community College
Rochester Community and Technical College
South Central College
Southwest Minnesota State University
St. Catherine University
St. Cloud State University
St. Cloud Technical and Community College
St. Olaf College
University of Minnesota Twin Cities
University of Minnesota Crookston
University of Minnesota Duluth
Winona State University

Mississippi
Mississippi State University (all campuses)
Belhaven University
Blue Mountain College
Coahoma Community College
Copiah-Lincoln Community College
Delta State University
East Mississippi Community College, Scooba and Mayhew
Hinds Community College at Utica
Holmes Community College (4 campuses)
Itawamba Community College
Jones County Junior College
Mississippi College
Mississippi Gulf Coast Community College
Northeast Mississippi Community College
University of Mississippi (Oxford campus)
University of Southern Mississippi

Missouri
Cox College
Drury University
East Central College
Evangel University
Fontbonne University
Hannibal-LaGrange University
Harris–Stowe State University
Jefferson College
Kansas City University of Medicine and Biosciences
Lindenwood University
Maryville University
Metropolitan Community College
Missouri Western State University
North Central Missouri College
Northwest Missouri State University
Ozarks Technical Community College
St. Louis College of Pharmacy
St. Charles Community College
St. Louis Community College
St. Louis University
St. Louis University Medical Center
State Fair Community College
Truman State University
University of Missouri
University of Missouri – St. Louis
Washington University in St. Louis
Webster University
Westminster College

Montana
Montana State University
Montana Tech of the University of Montana
University of Montana
University of Montana Western

Nebraska
Bellevue University
Clarkson College
College of Saint Mary
Creighton University
Mid-Plains Community College
Nebraska Methodist College
Union College 
University of Nebraska at Kearney
University of Nebraska–Lincoln
University of Nebraska Medical Center
University of Nebraska Omaha
York University

Nevada
 University of Nevada, Reno
 Western Nevada College, Carson City & Fallon (from the fall of 2017)

New Hampshire

University of New Hampshire, Manchester*
Nashua Community College, Nashua*
Granite State College
Great Bay Community College, Portsmouth and Rochester*
Plymouth State University
White Mountains Community College, Berlin and Littleton*

New Jersey
Bergen Community College
Berkeley College
Brookdale Community College
Burlington County College
Camden County College
County College of Morris
Essex County College
Gloucester County College
Middlesex College
Middlesex County College
Montclair State University
Ocean County College
Raritan Valley Community College*
Rowan College at Burlington County
Salem Community College
Sussex County Community College

New Mexico
University of New Mexico*
Navajo Technical College

New York
Barnard College
Berkeley College
Binghamton University
Broome Community College
Canisius College
Cayuga Community College
Cazenovia College
City University of New York
Clinton Community College
College of Saint Rose
Columbia University (designated smoking areas)
Corning Community College
City University of New York
CUNY School of Medicine
CUNY School of Public Health
D'Youville University
Davis College
Erie Community College
Maria College
Mohawk Valley Community College, Utica & Rome
Monroe County Community College
New York University 
Pass University
Paul Smith's College
Rensselaer Polytechnic Institute
Rochester Institute of Technology
Rockland Community College
Sage Colleges
St. Francis College
State University of New York
Jamestown Community College
State University of New York at Buffalo
State University of New York at Canton
State University of New York at Cortland
State University of New York at Plattsburgh (Tobacco use on the campus is restricted to a limited number of designated parking lots.)
State University of New York College of Optometry
State University of New York at Oswego
State University of New York Upstate Medical University
Suffolk County Community College
University at Buffalo School of Medicine and Biomedical Sciences
Stony Brook University Hospital
Syracuse University
Union Graduate College
University of Rochester Medical Center
Vassar College 
Wells College
Westchester Community College

North Carolina
Appalachian State University*
Asheville-Buncombe Technical Community College
Barber-Scotia College
Beaufort County Community College
Belmont Abbey College*
Bennett College
Blue Ridge Community College
Brunswick Community College
Cabarrus College of Health Sciences
Campbell University*
Cape Fear Community College
Carolinas College of Health Sciences
Catawba College*
Catawba Valley Community College
Central Carolina Community College
Central Piedmont Community College
Chowan University*
Cleveland Community College
Coastal Carolina Community College
College of The Albemarle
Davidson County Community College
Durham Technical Community College
East Carolina University Health Sciences Campus
ECPI University (Greensboro campus)
Edgecombe Community College
Elon University*
Forsyth Technical Community College
Gardner-Webb University
Gaston College
Greensboro College
Guilford Technical Community College
Halifax Community College
Haywood Community College
High Point University
Laurel University
Lees–McRae College
Lenoir Community College
Lenoir–Rhyne University
Louisburg College
Mayland Community College
Mitchell Community College
Montgomery Community College
Montreat College
Peace College
Pfeiffer University
Piedmont Community College
Pitt Community College*
Randolph Community College
Richmond Community College
Roanoke-Chowan Community College
Rockingham Community College
Rowan-Cabarrus Community College
South Piedmont Community College
Southeastern Community College
Southwestern Community College
Stanly Community College
Surry Community College
University of North Carolina at Chapel Hill*
Vance-Granville Community College
Wake Technical Community College
Wayne Community College
Western Piedmont Community College
Wilkes Community College
Wingate University
Winston-Salem State University*

North Dakota
Bismarck State College
Dakota College at Bottineau
Dickinson State University
University of Jamestown
Lake Region State College
Mayville State University
Medcenter One College of Nursing
Minot State University
North Dakota State College of Science
North Dakota State University
Trinity Bible College
University of Mary
University of North Dakota
Valley City State University

Northern Mariana Islands
All public and private institutions are smoke-free by law.

Ohio
Ashland University College of Nursing
Bowling Green State University (designated smoking areas)
Case Western Reserve University
Cedarville University
Cuyahoga Community College
Heidelberg University
Hocking College
Kent State University
Lorain County Community College
Malone University
Miami University
Mount Carmel College of Nursing
Mount Vernon Nazarene University
Northeast Ohio Medical University
Notre Dame College of Ohio
Ohio Christian University
Ohio Dominican University
Owens Community College
Sinclair Community College
Ohio State University
Ohio State University College of Medicine
University of Akron
University of Cincinnati
University of Toledo Health Science Campus
Wright State University

Oklahoma
All public institutions are tobacco-free by law.
Oklahoma Baptist University
Oklahoma Christian University
Oklahoma City University
Southeastern Oklahoma State University
Southern Nazarene University
St. Gregory's University
Bacone College

Oregon
Chemeketa Community College
Corban University
George Fox University
Lane Community College*
Mt. Hood Community College
Multnomah University
National University of Natural Medicine
Northwest Christian University
Oregon Coast Community College
Oregon College of Oriental Medicine
Oregon Health & Science University
Oregon State University – Corvallis
Pacific University Health Professions Campus
Portland Community College (Cascade and Rock Creek campuses)
Tillamook Bay Community College
University of Oregon
Walla Walla University – Portland
Warner Pacific University
University of Western States

Pennsylvania
Baptist Bible College & Seminary
Bucks County Community College*
Butler County Community College
Carnegie Mellon University (designated smoking areas)
Cheyney University of Pennsylvania
Community College of Beaver County
Community College of Philadelphia
Delaware County Community College
Drexel University
Eastern University (smokeless tobacco also prohibited)
Fox Chase Cancer Center
Keystone College*
Lackawanna College
La Salle University
Lehigh Carbon Community College
Luzerne County Community College
Marywood University
Montgomery County Community College
Pennsylvania State University (from fall 2018)
Philadelphia College of Osteopathic Medicine
University of Pittsburgh (designated smoking areas)
Reading Area Community College
Salus University
University of Pennsylvania
University of the Sciences in Philadelphia
Widener University

South Carolina
Aiken Technical College
Allen University
Anderson University
Benedict College
Bob Jones University
Central Carolina Technical College
Charleston Southern University
Claflin University
Clemson University
Clinton College
Coker College 
College of Charleston
Columbia International University
Converse College
Coastal Carolina University
Denmark Technical College
Francis Marion University
Lander University
Medical University of South Carolina
Midlands Technical College
North Greenville University
Orangeburg–Calhoun Technical College
Piedmont Technical College
Presbyterian College
Southern Wesleyan University
Spartanburg Methodist College
The Citadel, The Military College of South Carolina
Tri-County Technical College
University of South Carolina Aiken 
University of South Carolina Beaufort 
University of South Carolina Columbia
University of South Carolina Salkehatchie 
University of South Carolina Sumter 
University of South Carolina Union 
University of South Carolina Upstate
Voorhees University
York Technical College

South Dakota
Dakota State University
Dakota Wesleyan University
Mount Marty University
Oglala Lakota College
South Dakota School of Mines and Technology
University of Sioux Falls
University of South Dakota

Tennessee
Austin Peay State University
Belmont University
Bryan College
Chattanooga State Community College
Dyersburg State Community College
East Tennessee State University
Freed–Hardeman University
Lane College
Lipscomb University
Middle Tennessee State University
Milligan University
Tennessee Technological University
University of Tennessee at Knoxville
University of Tennessee at Martin
Vanderbilt University

Texas
Abilene Christian University
Alamo Community College District
Alvin Community College*
Amarillo College
Angelina College
Austin Community College District
Baylor University
Blinn College
Collin College
Houston Christian University
Huston–Tillotson University
Lamar Institute of Technology
Lone Star College-Kingwood*
Midwestern State University
North Central Texas College
Paul Quinn College
St. Mary's University
San Jacinto College – South Campus
Southwestern Assemblies of God University
Stephen F. Austin State University
Sul Ross State University
Tarrant County College
Texas Christian University
Texas Southmost College
Texas State University
Texas Tech University Health Sciences Center
Tyler Junior College
University of North Texas
University of Texas at Arlington
University of Texas at Austin
University of Texas at Brownsville
University of Texas at Tyler
University of Texas Health Science Center at Houston
University of Texas Health Science Center at San Antonio
Victoria College
Weatherford College

Utah
 Brigham Young University
 LDS Business College
 University of Utah
 Utah Tech University
 Weber State University

Vermont
 University of Vermont
 University of Vermont Medical Center

Virginia
Eastern Virginia Medical School
Jefferson College of Health Sciences
Liberty University
Patrick Henry College
Regent University
Virginia commonwealth university
Randolph-Macon College

Washington
Clark College
Corban University
Everett Community College
Green River Community College
Lower Columbia College
Northwest University
Pacific Lutheran University
Pierce College
Seattle Pacific University
Seattle University
South Puget Sound Community College
Walla Walla University
Washington State University Spokane (Riverpoint campus)

West Virginia
Marshall University Health Sciences Campus
West Liberty University
West Virginia Northern Community College
West Virginia School of Osteopathic Medicine
West Virginia University Health Sciences Campus

Wisconsin
Alverno College
Bellin College
Carroll University
Chippewa Valley Technical College
Gateway Technical College
Madison Area Technical College
Marian University
Medical College of Wisconsin
Milwaukee Area Technical College
Moraine Park Technical College
Nicolet Area Technical College
Northland College
University of Wisconsin–Baraboo/Sauk County
University of Wisconsin–Madison Health Sciences Campus
University of Wisconsin–Milwaukee
University of Wisconsin–Stevens Point
University of Wisconsin–Stout
Waukesha County Technical College
Western Technical College
Northwood Technical College
Fox Valley Technical College

References

Notes

Sources

 ]

Tobacco control
Smoking
Health-related lists